This is a list of episodes for the ABC television series S.W.A.T.

The pilot for this series was a two-part episode of The Rookies titled "S.W.A.T." (February 17, 1975).

Series overview
{| class=wikitable style="text-align:center"
! colspan=2| Season
! Episodes
! First aired
! Last aired
|-
| style="width:5px; background:#6a181a"|
| 1
| 12
| 
| 
|-
| bgcolor="000070"|
| 2
| 25
| 
| 
|-
|}

Episodes

Season 1 (1975)

Season 2 (1975–76)

Notes
The opening sequence of the second-season episode "Terror Ship" re-used footage from the beginning of the first-season episode "Pressure Cooker," and the second-season episode "Deadly Weapons" similarly used re-edited footage taken from the first-season finale, "Sole Survivor."

References
 

S.W.A.T. (franchise)
Lists of action television series episodes
Lists of American crime drama television series episodes
Lists of American action television series episodes